Grant Tierney Bowler (October 24, 1907 – June 25, 1968) was a Major League Baseball pitcher who played for the Chicago White Sox in  and .

External links

1907 births
1968 deaths
Chicago White Sox players
DePaul Blue Demons baseball players
Major League Baseball pitchers
Baseball players from Colorado